The South African Railways Class 6E1, Series 8 of 1979 was an electric locomotive.

Between 1979 and 1981, the South African Railways placed 105 Class 6E1,  electric locomotives with a Bo-Bo wheel arrangement in mainline service.

Manufacturer
The 3 kV DC Class 6E1, Series 8 electric locomotive was designed and built for the South African Railways (SAR) by Union Carriage & Wagon (UCW) in Nigel, Transvaal. The electrical equipment was supplied by the General Electric Company (GEC).

Between 1979 and 1981, 105 locomotives were delivered, numbered in the range from E1896 to E2000. Like Series 6 and 7, the Series 8 units were equipped with AEI-283AY traction motors. UCW did not allocate builder’s or works numbers to the locomotives it built for the SAR, but used the SAR unit numbers for their record keeping.

Characteristics

Orientation

These dual cab locomotives had a roof access ladder on one side only, just to the right of the cab access door. The roof access ladder end was marked as the no. 2 end. A corridor along the centre of the locomotive connected the cabs which were identical apart from the fact that the handbrake was located in cab 2. A pantograph hook stick was stowed in a tube mounted below the lower edge of the locomotive body on the roof access ladder side. The locomotive had one square and two rectangular access panels along the lower half of the body on the roof access ladder side and only one square access panel on the opposite side.

Series identifying features

The Class 6E1 was produced in eleven series over a period of nearly sixteen years. While some of the Class 6E1 series are visually indistinguishable from their predecessors or successors, some externally visible changes did occur over the years.

Series 8 was the only Class 6E1 series with unique visual distinguishing features. It could be distinguished from all earlier series by its large hatch door on each side, below the second small window to the right of the side door on the roof access ladder side and below the first window immediately to the right of the side door on the other side. It could also be distinguished from all subsequent series by the absence of rainwater drainage holes along the lower body sides.

Crew access
The Class 5E, 5E1, 6E and 6E1 locomotives were notoriously difficult to enter from ground level since their lever-style door handles were at waist level when standing inside the cab. This made it impossible to open the door from outside without first climbing up high enough to reach the door handle while hanging on to the side handrails with one hand only. Crews therefore often choose to leave the doors ajar when parking and exiting the locomotives.

Series 8 and some late model Series 7 locomotives were equipped with doors on which the outside door latch handle was mounted near floor level with a simple drawer pull type handle at mid-door level.

Service
The Class 6E1 family saw service all over both 3 kV DC mainline and branch line networks, the smaller Cape Western mainline between Cape Town and Beaufort West and the larger network which covers portions of the Northern Cape, the Free State, Natal, Gauteng, North West and Mpumalanga.

Reclassification and rebuilding

Reclassification to Class 16E
During 1990 and 1991, Spoornet semi-permanently coupled several pairs of otherwise largely unmodified Class 6E1 locomotives, reclassified them to Class 16E and allocated a single locomotive number to each pair, with the individual units in the pairs inscribed "A" or "B". The aim was to accomplish savings on cab maintenance by coupling the units at their no. 1 ends, abandoning the no. 1 end cabs in terms of maintenance and using only the no. 2 end cabs. Most were later either disbanded with the units reverting to Class 6E1 and regaining their original numbers or getting rebuilt to Class 18E.

Ten known Series 8 locomotives were part of such Class 16E pairs.
 E1914 and E1915 became 16-503 A and B.
 E1916 and E1917 became 16-501 A and B.
 E1918 and E1919 became 16-505 A and B.
 E1925 and E1926 became 16-504 A and B.
 E1928 and E1929 became 16-506 A and B.

Modification to Class 17E

Class 17E locomotives were modified and reclassified from Class 6E1 Series 7, 8 or 9 locomotives during 1993 and 1994. Key modifications included improved regenerative braking and wheel-slip control to improve their reliability on the steep gradients and curves of the Natal mainline. Unlike the unmodified but reclassified Class 16E locomotives, the Class 17Es retained their original unit numbers after reclassification.

A stumbling block was that the regeneration equipment at many of the sub-stations along the route was unreliable. Since there was no guarantee that another train would be in the same section to absorb the regenerated energy, there was always the risk that line voltage could exceed 4.1 kV, which would make either the sub-station or the locomotive trip out. As a result, the subsequently rebuilt Class 18E locomotives were not equipped with regenerative braking.

Fifty-five known Series 8 locomotives were modified and reclassified to Class 17E. Their unit numbers are listed in the table.

Rebuilding to Class 18E

Beginning in 2000, Spoornet began a project to rebuild Series 2 to 11 Class 6E1 locomotives to Class 18E, Series 1 and Series 2 at the Transnet Rail Engineering workshops at Koedoespoort. In the process the cab at the no. 1 end was stripped of all controls and the driver's front and side windows were blanked off to have a toilet installed, thereby forfeiting the locomotive's bi-directional ability.

Since the driving cab's noise level had to be below 85 decibels, cab 2 was selected as the Class 18E driving cab primarily based on its lower noise level compared to cab 1, which was closer and more exposed to the compressor's noise and vibration. Another factor was the closer proximity of cab 2 to the low voltage switch panel. The fact that the handbrake was located in cab 2 was not a deciding factor, but was considered an additional benefit.

While the earlier Class 6E1, Series 2 to 7 locomotives had been built with a brake system which consisted of various valves connected to each other with pipes and commonly referred to as a "bicycle frame" brake system, the Class 6E1, Series 8 to 11 locomotives were built with an air equipment frame brake system, commonly referred to as a brake rack. Since the design of the rebuilt Class 18E locomotives included the same brake rack, the rebuilding project was begun with the newer series 8 to 11 locomotives to reduce the overall cost of rebuilding. 

Bar two, all the Class 6E1, Series 8 locomotives which were used in this rebuilding project were rebuilt to Class 18E, Series 1 locomotives. The known numbers and renumbering details are listed in the table.

Liveries
All but six Class 6E1, Series 8 locomotives were delivered in the SAR Gulf Red livery with signal red cowcatchers, yellow whiskers and with the number plates on the sides mounted on three-stripe yellow wings. The six exceptions, numbers E1950 to E1955, were delivered in blue with yellow whiskers for use with the Blue Train between Cape Town and Beaufort West. However, there was a demand for two more blue train locomotives and 1956 and 1957 were repainted in blue. In the 1990s many of the Series 8 units began to be repainted in the Spoornet orange livery with a yellow and blue chevron pattern on the cowcatchers. Some later received the Spoornet maroon livery while numbers E1950 to E1957 and no. E1973 were repainted in either the Spoornet orange era or maroon era blue train livery. In the Passenger Rail Agency of South Africa (PRASA) era after 2008, no. E1950 was first repainted in the Shosholoza Meyl purple livery and later in the PRASA blue livery.

The main picture shows both versions of the Spoornet Blue Train livery. The leading locomotive, no. E1973, is in the orange era livery with the name "SPOORNET" below the emblem on the side, while the trailing locomotive, no. E1951, is in the maroon era livery without the name "SPOORNET" below the emblem on the side.

Four of the Blue Train locomotives were damaged on 24 April 1997 when train numbers 81007 and 18008, two Trans-Karoo passenger trains, collided at Gouda. The four damaged locomotives were later replaced by eight Class 6E locomotives which were repainted in blue.

Of the four damaged blue locomotives, numbers E1953 and E1956 were scrapped while numbers E1954 and E1955 were rebuilt to the first two Class 18E locomotives in 2000 and 2001, numbered  and  respectively.

Illustration

References

External links

Bo-Bo locomotives
Cape gauge railway locomotives
2940
Railway locomotives introduced in 1979
Union Carriage & Wagon locomotives